Vaiatekeue is an island of the Gambier Islands of French Polynesia.

See also

 Desert island
 List of islands

References

Islands of the Gambier Islands
Uninhabited islands of French Polynesia